Army General Alexander Ivanovich Baranov (born 13 May 1946) is a Russian general, and was the Commander of the North Caucasus Military District from July 2004 to May 2008. He is a recipient of the Hero of Russia award.

Yandiev case
In July 2006 the European Court of Human Rights found the government of Russia guilty of the failure to protect from ill-treatment and a violation of the "right to life" of an alleged Chechen rebel fighter, Khadzhi-Murat Yandiev. Key evidence in the case, according to court documents, was video footage filmed by a reporter for NTV and CNN television showing an army officer, later identified as Alexander Baranov, ordering soldiers to "finish off" and "shoot" Yandiev after an argument between the two. Yandiev was then separated from the other prisoners and has not been seen since.

Baranov, who has been questioned twice over the matter, has denied he sent Yandiev to his death. He argues that his "intervention" was meant to calm Yandiev down, and that the soldiers were not his direct subordinates and therefore could not have taken orders from him.

See also
Second Chechen War

Honours and awards
 Hero of the Russian Federation (5 May 2000)
 Order of the Red Star
 Order of Military Merit
 Order for Service to the Homeland in the Armed Forces of the USSR,  3rd class

External links
 European Court Sides With Chechen Mother Moscow Times
 European Court Orders Russia to Compensate Chechen Mother for Loss of Son
 

1946 births
Heroes of the Russian Federation
Recipients of the Order of Military Merit (Russia)
Living people
Generals of the army (Russia)
People of the Chechen wars
Recipients of the Order of the Red Star